Asmundson is a surname. Notable people with the surname include:

Freeman Asmundson (born 1943), retired Canadian professional ice hockey player
Gordon J. G. Asmundson, Canadian psychologist
Ossie Asmundson (1908–1964), professional ice hockey right winger
Ruthlane Uy Asmundson, political moderate currently serving as Mayor of the City of Davis, California, USA